Jim Gilmore (James Stuart Gilmore III, born 1949) is an American politician, diplomat and former attorney.

James Gilmore may also refer to:

Jim Gilmore (baseball) (1853–1928), American baseball player
James Gilmore (Wisconsin politician) (1786–1848), member of the Wisconsin State Assembly
James A. Gilmore (1876–1947), American president of the Federal League
James Gilmore Elementary School, school in Richmond, British Columbia, Canada

See also
James Gilmour (disambiguation)